Chandupatla is a historical village (first Hindu woman emperor of India, Rani Rudrama Devi died in a war) and Gram Panchayat of Nakrekal, Nalgonda District, Telangana state, India.

History

Chandupatla, Nakrekal Mandal has the traces of rich history. The Hindu, historian D. Suraya Kumar explored megalithic monuments, which are from the Iron Age period (1000 B.C. to 200 B.C.) and found three types of Megalithic monuments: stone circles, dolemanscist burials, and burrows. These are funerary burials of ancient Iron Age people.
Chalukyas, Kakatiyas, and finally Nizams ruled it. Chandupatla temples with intricately carved stone pillars stand testimony to the architectural style of the Kakatiya period. Trescoes and inscriptions tell the tales of the rulers of the Kakatiya dynasty.
In olden days, Chandupatla was a big village than Nakrekal and people made business here. Later some of those rich people were migrated to Nakrekal and Hyderabad.

Recently restored inscription  on the death of Rani Rudrama in Chandupatla Village చందుపట్లలో రాణిరుద్రమ తుదిశ్వాస, it is believed that Queen Kakatiya  Rudrama Devi died
(1289 AD, 27 November) here when she was seriously injured in a war with Ambadeva, a rebel Kayastha chief.
Rudrama Devi had initiated several welfare programmes like digging tanks for bringing many acres under cultivation which was an inspiration for the Telangana government in restoring all the minor irrigation tanks.

Besides, the historian said that Rudrama Devi had also introduced several welfare programmes for the betterment of the life of her people while effectively confronting invading male warriors during her 30 years from 1259 to 1289.

Besides an inscription, there are historical statues of Lord Ganesha and a warrior riding on the back of a horse in the village. 
The village tank, Rasamudram, built during the Kakatiya Samudram, also finds a mention in the inscription because the inscription was installed very close to the village tank by a soldier of Rudrama Devi's army Puvvula Mummadi, who is believed to be a native of Chandupatla.
The inscription also says the Chief of Army of Rudrama Devi, Mallikarjuna Nayakudu, was killed on the same day, but there was no mention of the reason and the place of her death.(కాకతీయ సామంతులలో ఒకరైన కాయస్థ అంబాదేవుడు తిరుగుబాటు చేయగా నల్గొండ జిల్లాలో చందుపట్ల నందు ఆమె ప్రాణాలు కోల్పోయింది)

References

Villages in Nalgonda district